Magder is a surname. Notable people with the surname include:

Ari Magder (1983–2012), Canadian-born American actor 
Daniel Magder (born 1991), Canadian actor

See also
Mader (surname)
Mager